Island of Dreams may refer to:

 "Island of Dreams" (song), a 1962 song by The Springfields
The Island of Dreams, a 1925 German silent film
 "Island of Dreams" (Grimm), a season one episode of the television series Grimm
 Island of Dreams (amusement park), a Moscow amusement park

See also
 Dream Island (disambiguation)